This article lists important figures and events in Malaysian public affairs during the year 1976, together with births and deaths of notable Malaysians.

Incumbent political figures

Federal level
Yang di-Pertuan Agong: Sultan Yahya Petra 
Raja Permaisuri Agong: Raja Perempuan Zainab 
Prime Minister: 
Tun Abdul Razak (until 14 January)
Tun Hussein Onn (from 15 January)
Deputy Prime Minister: Dato' Dr Mahathir Mohamad (from 5 March)
Lord President: Mohamed Suffian Mohamed Hashim

State level
 Sultan of Johor: Sultan Ismail
 Sultan of Kedah: Sultan Abdul Halim Muadzam Shah
 Sultan of Kelantan: Tengku Ismail Petra (Regent)
 Raja of Perlis: Tuanku Syed Putra
 Sultan of Perak: Sultan Idris Shah II
 Sultan of Pahang: Sultan Ahmad Shah (Deputy Yang di-Pertuan Agong)
 Sultan of Selangor: Sultan Salahuddin Abdul Aziz Shah
 Sultan of Terengganu: Sultan Ismail Nasiruddin Shah
 Yang di-Pertuan Besar of Negeri Sembilan: Tuanku Jaafar
 Yang di-Pertua Negeri (Governor) of Penang: Tun Sardon Jubir
 Yang di-Pertua Negeri (Governor) of Malacca: Tun Syed Zahiruddin bin Syed Hassan
 Yang di-Pertua Negeri (Governor) of Sarawak: Tun Tuanku Bujang Tuanku Othman
 Yang di-Pertua Negeri (Governor) of Sabah: Tun Mohd Hamdan Abdullah

Events
14 January – Tun Abdul Razak, second Malaysian prime minister died in London, United Kingdom due to leukaemia. On 16 January, his body was brought back to Malaysia and laid to rest at Makam Pahlawan near Masjid Negara, Kuala Lumpur.
15 January – Tun Hussein Onn replaced Tun Abdul Razak as prime minister.
6 February – The 75th anniversary of the Institute of Medical Research was celebrated.
21 February – Subang Jaya, a new township in Petaling Jaya, Selangor developed by Sime Darby was established. 
28 February – Yahya Petra of Kelantan was installed as the sixth Yang di-Pertuan Agong.
5 March – Mahathir Mohamad was appointed Deputy Prime Minister of Malaysia.
8 April – The 20-storey Campbell Shopping Complex, Kuala Lumpur's very first high-rise shopping complex was completely destroyed in a fire. It was Malaysia's first towering inferno and the worst fire disaster involving a high-rise building to date.
27 April – A Royal Malaysian Air Force RMAF's Sikorsky S-61 Nuri helicopter was shot down by communist terrorists in Gubir, Kedah killing eleven Malaysian Armed Forces (MAF) military personnel. This was the first person killed in action (KIA) in RMAF history.
6 June – Ten passengers, including Sabah chief minister and former state Yang di-Pertua Negeri (Governor), Tun Fuad Stephens, and one crew were killed in a plane crashes 1976 near Kota Kinabalu. Tun Fuad Stephens' body was interred at State Mausoleum near Sabah State Mosque, Kota Kinabalu.
16 July – The Police Field Force (PFF) withdrew from Betong, Thailand after Thailand closed its border with Malaysia.
17 August – The State Council Complex and Administrative Building, Sarawak was officially opened.
18 October – The 25th anniversary of the Employees Provident Fund was celebrated.
21 October – The opening of Sultan Abu Bakar Museum in Pekan District, Pahang.
20 November – The 25th anniversary of the Malaysian Association for the Blind was celebrated.
14 December – The Kuala Lumpur Stock Exchange (KLSE) was incorporated.

Births
23 January – Shahrol Yuzy – Malaysian motorcycle Grand Prix rider
6 February – Choong Tan Fook – Badminton player (doubles)
28 May – Chew Choon Eng – Badminton player (doubles)
20 July – Alex Yoong – F1 and A1GP driver
31 August – Ah Niu – Malaysian Chinese singer

Deaths
14 January – Abdul Razak Hussein – Second Malaysian Prime Minister
6 June – Tun Fuad Stephens or Fuad Stephens – Sabah chief minister and former state Yang di-Pertua Negeri (Governor)
17 October – Tun Uda – Governor of Penang Early 1957.

References

See also 
 1976 
 1975 in Malaysia | 1977 in Malaysia
 History of Malaysia

 
Years of the 20th century in Malaysia
Malaysia
Malaysia
1970s in Malaysia